Kim Heechul & Kim Jungmo (formerly M&D, shortened from Midnight & Dawn or Miari & Dangye-dong) was a South Korean pop rock duo formed by SM Entertainment in 2011. The group was composed of Super Junior's Heechul and TraxX's Kim Jung-mo. Both members decided to write and compose every song the project group released. They'll continuously release music which they can and want to do, regardless of the genre.
Their debut single, "Close Ur Mouth" was released in June 2011 under the name, M&D. In early July 2016, SM Entertainment announced that the duo would return as Kim Heechul & Kim Jungmo.

The group disbanded on April 30, 2019.

History

M&D released their debut digital single "Close Ur Mouth" on June 22, 2011. They also released their music video, starring various artists, including F.T. Island's Choi Jong-hoon and Lee Hong-gi, Supreme Team's Simon D, Miss A's Jia, Beast's Yong Jun-hyung and Comedian Kim Kyung Jin. Their first live performance was at Mnet’s summer awards ceremony 20’s Choice on July 7.

In early-April 2015, SM Entertainment announced that M&D would release their first mini-album Cottage Industry with the lead track "I Wish" digitally on April 16 and physically on April 20. The lead track was also written and composed by the duo. They made their comeback stage on M Countdown on April 16.

Heechul released a collaboration single with Mamamoo's Wheein called "Narcissus" on April 15, 2016, as a part of SM Entertainment's project SM Station. The single was written by Heechul and produced by Jungmo. The music video starred model Kim Jin-kyung. In early July 2016, SM Entertainment announced that the duo would return as Kim Heechul & Kim Jungmo, with a 2nd mini-album Goody Bag, and trot-rock lead track "Ulsanbawi" on July 12. The album consists of six tracks, which were written by Heechul and composed by Jungmo. They also released a music video starring DIA's Chaeyeon.

On April 30, 2019, Jungmo left SM Entertainment, ending M&D permanently.

Discography

Extended plays

Singles

Videography

Tour and showcase

 Kim Heechul & Kim Jungmo Showcase "Dear My Fan" (2016)
 SM Town Live World Tour V (2016)

References

Notes

External links

Kim Heechul & Kim Jungmo
SM Entertainment artists
SM Town
Musical groups established in 2011
Musical groups from Seoul
K-pop music groups
South Korean pop rock music groups
South Korean rock music groups
South Korean musical duos
2011 establishments in South Korea